Taylor von Kriegenbergh (born May 19, 1988) is an American professional poker player.

Early life and education 
Von Kriegenbergh was born in Stoneham, Massachusetts. A 2006 graduate of Stoneham High School, von Kriegenbergh went on to play Division II varsity baseball at the University of Massachusetts Lowell, where he earned a Bachelor of Science degree in Marketing and Management.

Career 
On May 3, 2011, von Kriegenbergh won his first World Poker Tour (WPT) championship at the inaugural WPT Seminole Hard Rock Showdown in Hollywood, Florida, earning $1,122,340 and his first WPT bracelet.  The 2011 Hard Rock Showdown was von Kriegenbergh's first WPT tournament.

He then went on to become a history teacher at New Heights Academy Charter School

Personal life 
Von Kriegenbergh is currently a resident of New York, New York.

References

External links 
 http://espn.go.com/sports/fantasy/blog/_/name/poker/id/6471836/von-kriegenbergh-elder-grab-1m-titles
 http://www.pokernewsreport.com/wpt-makes-taylor-von-kriegenbergh-new-millionaire-2056
 http://www.pokernews.com/news/2011/05/taylor-von-kriegenbergh-wins-wpt-seminole-hard-rock-showdown-10326.htm

1988 births
Living people
American poker players
People from Stoneham, Massachusetts
Sportspeople from Middlesex County, Massachusetts
World Poker Tour winners
University of Massachusetts Lowell alumni
UMass Lowell River Hawks baseball players